Franjić is a surname. Notable people with the surname include:
 Mario Franjić (born 1962), Bosnian bobsledder
 Ivan Franjic (born 1987), Australian soccer player
 Petar Franjić (born 1991), Croatian footballer
 Petar Franjic (born 1992), Australian soccer player
 Ivan Franjić (born 1997), German-Croatian footballer
 Bartol Franjić (born 2000), Croatian footballer